SCTC may refer to

 Space Colonization Technical Committee, American Institute of Aeronautics and Astronautics
 Specific Claims Tribunal Canada
 Submarine Chaser Training Center, Miami
 Sunshine Coast Theological College, Queensland, Australia
 Systems & Computer Technology Corp., which was acquired by SunGard
 Maquehue Airport, Temuco, Chile